The Quivering (also known as Spud II) is a single-player horror/comedy themed video game, developed by Charybdis and released by Alternative Software on CD-ROM for MS-DOS and Microsoft Windows. The game is a sequel to Charybdis' earlier 1996 game Spud!.

Plot
During a chemistry experiment, Uncle Olivetti accidentally opens a portal to Dimension X, which unleashes a horde of monsters led by the evil Big D, who transforms Olivetti into a raven. Olivetti's nephew, Spud steps forth to defeat Big D, restore his uncle and save the world from the incoming horror.

Gameplay
The player moves around in a 3D area with a 360 degree rotation.

Reception

References

External links
Official website

1997 video games
Adventure games
Alternative Software games
Comedy games
DOS games
1990s horror video games
Science fiction video games
Single-player video games
Video games developed in the United Kingdom
Video games scored by Jim Croft
Windows games